Schusterman is a surname. Notable people with the surname include:

Charles Schusterman (1945-2000), American businessman and philanthropist
Lynn Schusterman (born 1939), American philanthropist
Martín Schusterman (born 1975), Argentine rugby union footballer 
Neal Shusterman (born 1962), American author of Young Adult literature
Stacy H. Schusterman (born  1963), American businesswoman and philanthropist